Statue of Benito Juárez may refer to

 Benito Juárez (Martinez)
 Statue of Benito Juárez, Cholula, Puebla, Mexico
 Statue of Benito Juárez (New Orleans), Louisiana, United States
 Statue of Benito Juárez (New York City), New York, United States
 Statue of Benito Juárez (San Diego), California, United States
 Statue of Benito Juárez (Washington, D.C.), United States